Aidan Devine is an English–Canadian film actor. He was born in England and immigrated with his family to Canada at the age of 15.  He studied at Dawson College's Dome Theatre in Montreal, Quebec and began his acting career in Montreal.   He would later relocate to Toronto, Ontario.   His 1993 breakout role came in Denys Arcand's, Love and Human Remains.  Since then he has worked steadily in Canadian and American television and cinema capturing two Gemini Awards; a best actor award in 1997 for his performance as Ted Lindsay in Net Worth and in 1998, a best supporting actor Gemini for his performance as airframe engineer, Jim Chamberlin in The Arrow.  He has been nominated three other times.

Filmography

Feature films 

 1985 Night Magic
 1986 The Boy in Blue
 1986 And Then You Die
 1988 The Jeweller's Shop
 1988 Criminal Law
 1990 A Touch of Murder
 1990 Falling Over Backwards
 1993 Love & Human Remains
 1997 Joe's Wedding
 1999 The Wishing Tree
 1999 Dinner at Fred's
 1999 Striking Poses
 1999 Judgment Day: The Ellie Nesler Story
 2001 Reunion (short)
 2001 Don't Say a Word
 2003 Cold Creek Manor
 2004 Against the Ropes
 2004 Irish Eyes
 2005 The Dark Hours
 2005 A History of Violence
 2006 Everything's Gone Green
 2008 Outlander
 2009 Dolan's Cadillac
 2012 Mad Ship
 2013 The Informant
 2015 The Birdwatcher
 2018 Backstabbing for Beginners
 2018 22 Chaser
 2018 Catch and Release
 2018 I'll Take Your Dead

TV movies 
 1990 Double Identity
 1990 Descending Angel
 1992 The Boys of St. Vincent
 1993 Dieppe
 1994 Against Their Will: Women in Prison
 1995 Net Worth
 1995 Iron Eagle IV
 1997 Trucks
 1997 Promise the Moon
 1997 Too Close to Home
 1997 Joe Torre: Curveballs Along the Way
 1999 36 Hours to Die
 2000 Who Killed Atlanta's Children?
 2001 Life with Judy Garland: Me and My Shadows
 2001 Brian's Song
 2001 A Wind at My Back Christmas
 2002 Scar Tissue
 2002 100 Days in the Jungle
 2003 Ice Bound: A Woman's Survival at the South Pole
 2004 The Reagans
 2005 Our Fathers
 2006 The House Next Door
 2007 Involuntary Muscles
 2012 John A.: Birth of a Country - John Sandfield Macdonald

Television series 
 1996 Max the Cat (voice)
 1999 The City (13 episodes)
 2008 M.V.P. (2 episodes)
 2010 Rookie Blue (5 episodes)
 2013 Hannibal
 2014 24 Hour Rental
 2016 Eyewitness (American TV series)
 2019 The Bold Type (6 episodes)

Television mini-series 
 1997 The Arrow
 2001 Dice
 2001 Trudeau
 2006 Prairie Giant: The Tommy Douglas Story
 2007 St. Urbain's Horseman
 2010 Keep Your Head Up, Kid: The Don Cherry Story

Awards and nominations

Gemini Awards
 Nominated: Best Performance by an Actor in a Supporting Role, Dieppe (1995)
 Won: Best Performance by an Actor in a Leading Role in a Dramatic Program, Net Worth (1997)
 Won: Best Performance by an Actor in a Featured Supporting Role in a Dramatic Program or Mini-Series, The Arrow (1998)
 Nominated: Best Performance by an Actor in a Featured Supporting Role in a Dramatic Program or Mini-Series, 100 Days In The Jungle (2003)
 Nominated: Best Performance by an Actor in a Featured Supporting Role in a Dramatic Program or Mini-Series, Scar Tissue (2003)

References

External links

Living people
British male film actors
British male television actors
British emigrants to Canada
Canadian male film actors
Canadian male television actors
Canadian male voice actors
Year of birth missing (living people)
Best Supporting Actor in a Television Film or Miniseries Canadian Screen Award winners